The International Trade Union Confederation (ITUC) is the world's largest trade union federation.

History 
The federation was formed on 1 November 2006 out of the merger of the International Confederation of Free Trade Unions (ICFTU) and the World Confederation of Labour (WCL). The Founding Congress of the ITUC was held in Vienna and was preceded by the dissolution congresses of both the ICFTU and the WCL. The ITUC has three main regional organizations: the Asia-Pacific Regional Organization, the Trade Union Confederation of the Americas, and the African Regional Organisation. The Trade Union Development Cooperation Network (TUDCN) is an initiative of the ITUC whose main objective is to bring the trade union perspective into international development policy debates and improve the coordination and effectiveness of trade union development cooperation activities.

The ITUC represents 207 million workers through its 331 affiliated organizations within 163 countries and territories. Sharan Burrow is the current General Secretary.

The ITUC traces its origins back to the First International (also known as the International Workingmen's Association) and in 2014 commemorated the 150th anniversary of the founding of the International Working Men's Association at its own world congress held in Berlin. Also in 2014, the ITUC debuted the Global Rights Index, which ranks nations on 97 metrics pertaining to workers' rights, such as freedom from violent conditions and the right to strike and unionize. According to the 2020 update of the Index, there has been a significant increase in violations of workers' rights around the world.

Inaugural congress 2006
The founding congress of the ITUC was held from 1 to 3 November 2006 in Vienna, Austria.

The first day of the congress saw the formal creation of the ITUC followed by an address by Juan Somavia, the Director-General of the International Labour Organization (ILO).

Day two included Pascal Lamy, the Director-General of the World Trade Organization (WTO) responding to panel discussions on the impact of globalisation, including the topics "Cohesion and chaos - the global institutions" and "Global unions - global companies". Technical difficulties limited Lamy's satellite video link participation.

Leadership and officers were elected on the final day of the congress. Guy Ryder, the former general secretary of the ICFTU, was elected to the same position in the new organisation. Sharan Burrow was elected president. A Governing Council was established, with 70 elected members, and 8 additional seats reserved for youth and women’s representatives.

A Council of Global Unions was also formed on the final day of the congress. It was established jointly with ten global union federations and the Trade Union Advisory Committee to the OECD (TUAC).

Second congress 2010
The second congress of the ITUC was held from 21 to 25 June 2010 in Vancouver, Canada.

On 25 June 2010, at the conclusion of the congress, Sharan Burrow (then ITUC President) was elected General Secretary, succeeding Guy Ryder (who had been elected as Deputy Director General of the International Labour Organization).  In anticipation of her election, Burrow had resigned from her position as President of the Australian Council of Trade Unions effective 1 July 2010.

Speaking to the Congress after her election, Burrow paid tribute to her predecessor and emphasized the continuing role of organized labour in the world's emergence from the Global Financial Crisis.  She also made special mention of the significance of her election as the first female leader of the world's largest trade union (against a background of high workforce participation by women and a Congress 50 per cent of whose delegates were women):
I am a warrior for woman and we still have work to ensure the inclusion of women in the work place and in our unions. The struggles for women are multiple – too often within their families for independence, then in the workplace for rights and equal opportunity, in their unions for access and representation and then as union leaders. But the investment in and participation of women is not only a moral mandate it is an investment in democracy and a bulwark against fundamentalism and oppression. Organising woman is and must continue to be a priority for the ITUC.

Organisation

The Pan-European Regional Council (PERC), a European trade union organisation within the ITUC was formed 19 March 2007. It consists of 87 national trade union centres and a total membership of 87 million. It works closely with the European Trade Union Confederation (ETUC). The ITUC raises capital through charging dues to its member organisations.

Leadership

General Secretaries
2006: Guy Ryder
2010: Sharan Burrow
2018: Víctor Báez
2022: Luca Visentini

Presidents
2006: Sharan Burrow
2010: Michael Sommer
2014: João Antonio Felicio
2018: Ayuba Wabba
2022: Akiko Gono

See also

 Decent work
 General Confederation of Trade Unions
 Global Rights Index
 Global union federation
 List of federations of trade unions
 World Federation of Trade Unions

Notes

References

Bibliography
 Fabio Bertini (2011), Gilliatt e la piovra. Il sindacalismo internazionale dalle origini ad oggi (1776-2006), Roma, Aracne
 Ed Mustill (2013), The Global Labour Movement: An Introduction, a short guide to the global union federations, the ITUC, and other international bodies

External links

 
 
 ITUC Global Rights Index 2020

 
International organisations based in Belgium
Trade unions established in 2006
2006 establishments in Austria
International and regional union federations